The Jackson State Tigers football team represents Jackson State University in college football at the NCAA Division I Football Championship Subdivision (FCS) level as a member of the Southwestern Athletic Conference (SWAC).

After joining the Southwestern Athletic Conference (SWAC) in 1958, the program exploded into national prominence. In the 1980s, the program enjoyed its greatest success. Under head coach W. C. Gorden, the Tigers won eight conference championships between 1980 and 1990, including four straight from 1985 to 1988.

Since 1958, Jackson State has won about 25 percent of the conference's football championships (18) and is a perennial powerhouse program among HBCUs. The Tigers have produced 93 professional football players and four Pro Football Hall of Famers: Lem Barney, Walter Payton, Robert Brazile, and Jackie Slater. Only 13 college football teams at any level have produced more Pro Football Hall of Famers than Jackson State.

Classifications 
 1958–1969: NAIA
 1970–1982: NAIA Division I
 1956–1972: NCAA College Division
 1973–1976: NCAA Division II
 1977: NCAA Division I
 1978–present: NCAA Division I–AA/FCS

Conference memberships 
 1911–1912: Independent
 1913: Southern Intercollegiate Athletic Conference
 1914-1934 Independent
 1935-1940 South Central Athletic Conference
 1941-1946 Independent
 1947–1950: South Central Athletic Conference
 1951: Independent
 1952–1957: Midwest Athletic Association
 1958–present: Southwestern Athletic Conference

JSU fanbase
Jackson State is widely noted for its strong football support and culture.  Jackson State fans have led the Division I FCS in attendance for multiple seasons.

Championships

National Championships
 HBCU football national championships: 1962, 1985, 1996

Conference championships
Jackson State has earned a total of 20 conference championships and has won the SWAC (Southwestern Athletic Conference) title 18 times since joining in 1958. Conference championships include:

Division championships
The Southwestern Athletic Conference instituted a divisional system for football in 1999. Jackson State plays in the Eastern Division of the conference along with Alabama A&M, Alabama State, Alcorn State, and Mississippi Valley. The SWAC Western Division includes the University of Arkansas at Pine Bluff, Grambling, Prairie View A&M, Southern U, and Texas Southern. Each season, the SWAC East and SWAC West divisional champions face off in the SWAC Championship Game. Jackson State University claims seven SWAC Eastern Division championships: 1999, 2007, 2008, 2010, 2011, 2012, and 2013 and has won five outright to advance to the title game.

† Co–champions

^ win vacated by Southern University due to NCAA violations

NCAA I-AA/FCS playoff results
The Tigers have appeared in the I-AA/FCS playoffs 12 times with a record of 0–12.

Bowl games

Head coaches

Coach of the Year Honors

All-time SWAC records
This table reflects the results of SWAC (Southwestern Athletic Conference) match-ups when both Jackson State and its opponent were members of the conference. Jackson State began SWAC play in 1958. Examples of excluded results are Grambling 1937–1957, Alabama A&M contests (1948–1995), and 1910s/1950s contests vs Alabama State. See the College Football Data Warehouse  for more complete series records.

Updated through December 12, 2022 of the 2022 NCAA Division I FCS football season.

Rivalries 
During the early years of Jackson State’s football history, rivalries were established with in-State foes like Rust College and Tougaloo. Stillman College of Alabama was also a common opponent which brought excitement to games played at the Mississippi Fairgrounds and later at Alumni Field on the campus of Jackson State. Since then, JSU has formed several traditional rivalries with long-time foes.

Alcorn State

Southern

Tennessee State

All-Americans 
Over 50 Jackson State players have been named All-Americans.

Player of the Year 
Jackson State players that received Player of the Year honors.

College Football Hall of Fame members 
Kevin Dent
W. C. Gorden
John Merritt
Walter Payton
Willie Richardson
Robert Brazile

Pro football alumni 
See: List of Jackson State Tigers in the NFL Draft

, Jackson State has produced over 90 pro football players including four who have been inducted into the Pro Football Hall of Fame and 16 who have been selected to play in the Pro Bowl. Notable players include:

Economic impact 
In 2021, Jackson State football was responsible for having a $30 million positive economic impact on Jackson's economy.  Jackson State's football program is considered the most powerful in the Division I FCS in regards to generating a notable economic impact and drawing public interest.

Facilities 

Jackson State University owns and operates Mississippi Veterans Memorial Stadium. The 60,492-seat venue has been the home field of Jackson State Football since 1970.

References

External links
 

 
American football teams established in 1956
1956 establishments in Mississippi